John Bannister may refer to:

John Bannister (actor) (1760–1836), English actor and theatre manager
John Bannister (philologist) (1816–1873), English philologist

See also
John Banister (disambiguation)
Jack Bannister (1930–2016), cricket commentator